Carricknagat Megalithic Tombs are megalithic tombs and a National Monument located in County Sligo, Ireland.

Location

Carricknagat is located halfway between Ballygawley and Ballintogher, near a source of the Ballisodare River.

History
Carricknagat tombs were built c. 4000–2500 BC, in the Neolithic.

The name means "the cats' stone" or "the pine martens' stone;" ancient monuments are often said to be haunted by wild animals, possibly representing the spirits of the dead.

Description

West tomb
The tomb to the west, a wedge-shaped gallery grave (wedge tomb) called the Giant's Grave, is trapezoidal in plan with the inner end of a SSE-facing gallery (4 × 2.6 m) and is divided by jambs inset in the gallery walls, with a rear chamber 2 m (7 ft) long. The outer chamber is composed of side-stones, an upright stone and four three kerb-stones.

East tomb
This tomb, a dolmen, is traditionally called Dermot & Grania's Bed.

References

National Monuments in County Sligo
Archaeological sites in County Sligo
Megalithic monuments in Ireland
Tombs in the Republic of Ireland